Jasionowo  is a village in the administrative district of Gmina Lipsk, within Augustów County, Podlaskie Voivodeship, in north-eastern Poland, close to the border with Belarus. It is located within the historic Suwałki Region (Suwalszczyzna).

During the German occupation of Poland (World War II), on August 2, 1943, the Germans pacified the village in an act of anti-Polish revenge after losing an officer in a battle with the Poles. They surrounded the village and shot all the captured villagers, i.e. 58 people, and destroyed houses and outbuildings.

References

Villages in Augustów County